Zachary Mark Gowen (born March 30, 1983) is an American professional wrestler and promoter. Gowen competed for World Wrestling Entertainment and Total Nonstop Action Wrestling.

Gowen's left leg was amputated when he was eight years old. He is the only one-legged competitor ever to compete in WWE.

Early life
Gowen was diagnosed with cancer as a child, and lost his left leg due to amputation at the age of eight. He was a fan of professional wrestling from a young age, and cites Shawn Michaels and Rey Mysterio as two of his favorite wrestlers.

Zach is an alumnus at Churchill High School in Livonia, Michigan, Class of 2001.

Professional wrestling career

Early career
After being trained by Truth Martini, Gowen made his professional wrestling debut on March 16, 2002, in a loss to Martini. While training Gowen made the decision to wrestle without his prosthetic leg as he found it difficult to wrestle with the "dead weight".

Total Nonstop Action Wrestling (2003, 2005, 2006)
Gowen first gained national exposure wrestling for Total Nonstop Action Wrestling during early 2003 under the name Tenacious Z. On the January 29 NWATNA PPV, Tenacious Z defeated Truth Martini in a dark match. On the February 5 NWATNA PPV, Tenacious Z defeated B.G. James. On the February 12 NWATNA PPV, Tenacious Z, Ron Killings and Jorge Estrada defeated BG James, Glenn Gilbertti and Mike Sanders. Afterwards Gowen left TNA, opting not to sign an official contract on the advice of Martini, who advised him WWE were likely to offer him a contract. In February 2003, Gowan signed a development contract with World Wrestling Entertainment (WWE).

Gowen later returned to TNA on May 15, 2005 at their Hard Justice pay-per-view event, as the second entrant in the 20-Man Gauntlet for the Gold match. He lasted just under five minutes in the ring before being eliminated by Shark Boy. The next month, Gowen wrestled at the Slammiversary pay-per-view, losing in a six-way match. He also appeared on TNA Impact!, wrestling Mikey Batts to a no contest before leaving the promotion once again later that year. In October 2006, at Bound For Glory, Gowen returned to TNA during the Kevin Nash X-Division Open Battle Royal Gauntlet match as the sixth entrant, but was eliminated by Johnny Devine.

World Wrestling Entertainment (2003–2004)
He made his World Wrestling Entertainment debut on the May 15, 2003 episode of SmackDown! as a planted fan in the audience, who attempted to help Mr. America when he was being attacked by Roddy Piper and Sean O'Haire. During the segment, Piper pulled off Gowen's prosthetic leg. This began a short collaboration of Gowen and Mr. America, and a feud pitting the two against Roddy Piper and Sean O'Haire. This storyline culminated at the Judgment Day pay-per-view when Mr. America, accompanied by Gowen, defeated Piper, who was accompanied by O'Haire.

Gowen's partnership with Mr. America put him on bad terms with Mr. McMahon, as McMahon was convinced Mr. America was Hulk Hogan in disguise. On the June 26 episode of SmackDown!, McMahon told Gowen that if he would join his "Kiss My Ass Club", he would be awarded a WWE contract. Instead Gowen attacked McMahon. As a result, Gowen and Stephanie McMahon were put in a match against The Big Show, in what McMahon billed as the first "real" handicap match (referring to Gowen and his amputee status in addition to the two vs. one parameters of the match). With help from both Kurt Angle and Brock Lesnar, Gowen and Stephanie McMahon defeated the Big Show, winning Gowen a contract. Gowen's win further fueled the ill-feelings toward him from Mr. McMahon. This feud culminated in a one-on-one match between the two at Vengeance in which McMahon defeated Gowen.

Gowen then lost several singles matches to wrestlers including Shannon Moore, Nunzio, and John Cena, with Gowen being attacked by Matt Hardy, Moore's mentor, following each loss. The storyline was cut short on the August 21 episode of SmackDown!, when Gowen defeated Brock Lesnar by disqualification after Lesnar broke Gowen's leg in storyline.

Gowen was absent from television for nearly a month, returning in an interview on the October 2 episode of SmackDown! promoting his in-ring return for the following week. In his in-ring return, Gowen lost to Moore following interference from Hardy, reigniting their feud. As a result, Gowen and Hardy faced off in a singles match at No Mercy, which Gowen won. On the October 23 episode of SmackDown!, Gowen lost to Tajiri in a singles match, and afterward was attacked by two of Tajiri's associates. Gowen did not return to WWE television due to suffering an injury, and was later released from his WWE contract on February 4, 2004.

Independent circuit (2004–present)
Following his release from WWE, Gowen decided to focus on his education and work limited professional wrestling dates. He appeared for several independent promotions, including Independent Wrestling Association Mid-South (IWA Mid-South) where he played the character of an egotistical heel (villain). Gowen was part of the Jeff Peterson Memorial Cup in 2004.

In All American Wrestling, he is also a part of the "Michigan Invasion" heel stable (along with fellow Michigan wrestlers Truth Martini, "Amazing" N8 Mattson, Eddie Venom and Brian Gorie). On April 14, 2007, Gowen and his mystery partner Krotch defeated "Michigan Invasion" members Truth Martini and "Amazing" N8 Mattson to become new AAW Tag Team Champions. They then lost the championship to Trik Davis and Conrad Kennedy III in a four-way elimination match on June 16, 2007.

In a circus-based independent wrestling promotion, Squared Circle Revue, Gowen portrays a one-legged boy, under the ring name, Pogo The 1 Legged Boy.

In Prime Wrestling, Gowen formed a tag team with Gregory Iron known as "The Handicapped Handguns". The duo defeated The Dead Wrestling Society in January 2013 to become the Prime Tag Team Champions. They held the championship for three months, until losing it to Marion Fontaine and Jeremy Madrox on April 19. As the "Handicapped Heroes", Gowen and Iron also won the Clash Tag Team Championship on April 27. On October 20, 2013, The Handicapped Heroes regained the Prime Tag Team Championship.

Ring of Honor (2006, 2008, 2010)
Gowen made his Ring of Honor (ROH) debut on October 7, 2006, losing to Delirious in a singles match. Gowen would later return to ROH on February 22, 2008 in Deer Park, New York, immediately aligning himself with The Age of the Fall. On November 12, 2010, he appeared at an ROH show in Detroit, where he was announced as the newest member of Truth Martini's House of Truth faction. He teamed with ROH World Champion Roderick Strong and Michael Elgin in a loss to the Briscoe Brothers and Christopher Daniels. After a tag team loss to Grizzly Redwood and Bobby Dempsey at the following day's event in Toronto, Elgin and Martini turned on Gowen and kicked him out of the House of Truth.

Juggalo Championship Wrestling (2007–2008; 2011–present)
Gowen debuted in Juggalo Championship Wrestling as a part of their 2007 internet wrestling show SlamTV!. Initially a villain, his hard work ethic and wrestling abilities earned him the respect of the juggalo audience, per storyline. Following a failed attempt to win the JCW Heavyweight Championship from then-champion Trent Acid, Gowen formed the tag team Pimp & Gimp Connection with Human Tornado. The team made an immediate impact and earned themselves a spot in the 8 Team Tag-Team Elimination match for the JCW Tag Team Championship at Bloodymania. They failed to capture the championship after Gowen was eliminated by Doug Basham.

In the following season, Zach formed a tag team with Conrad Kennedy to compete in the JCW Tag Team Tournament for the vacant championship. Tornado, though, saw villainous manager Scott D'Amore leaving Kennedy's dressing room and grew suspicious. Two weeks later, Kennedy attacked Gowen after the team lost their match against The Bloody Brothers. Human Tornado ran into the ring to save Gowen, forcing Kennedy to retreat to the stage, where Scott D'Amore met with him. The following week, a match was set for Bloodymania II between Pimp & Gimp Connection and Conrad Kennedy with a mystery partner. The match, however, was scrapped after Gowen legitimately no-showed the event.

Zach returned to the company on March 23, 2011, where he defeated Jimmy Jacobs. He formed a tag team at Up in Smoke with U-Gene, who believed that he could be Gowen's second leg. Though U-Gene cost his team the match by distracting the referee, Gowen forgave him and announced that the team would wrestle again at the next event. On July 28, Gowen and U-Gene defeated the Ring Rydas to win the JCW Tag Team Championship. However, Gowen forfeited the championship after realizing that U-Gene cheated to win, causing U-Gene to attack him and disband the team. Both men wrestled each other at Bloodymania 5, with Gowen emerging victorious after U-Gene was caught cheating again.

Personal life
Gowen attended Eastern Michigan University, where he studied Secondary Education and Mathematics. He has four children, with his fiancée.

In 2016, Gowen competed in the Indianapolis qualifying round of the eighth season of American Ninja Warrior. He fell on the third obstacle, the fly wheels, and did not move on to the city finals.

Championships and accomplishments
3XWrestling
3XW Heavyweight Championship (1 time)All American WrestlingAAW Tag Team Championship (1 time) – with KrotchBlue Water Championship WrestlingBWCW Heavyweight Championship (1 time)CLASH WrestlingCLASH Tag Team Championship (1 time) – with Gregory IronCleveland All-Pro WrestlingCAPW Junior Heavyweight Championship (1 time)Cleveland Wrestling AllianceCWA Latino Velez Memorial Championship (1 time)Independent Wrestling RevolutionIWR King of the Indies Championship (1 time)
IWR Tag Team Championships (1 time) - with KamikazeMichigan Championship Wrestling AssociationMCWA Heavyweight Championship (1 time)Mid American WrestlingMAW Tag Team Championships (1 time) - with Silas YoungMr. Chainsaw Productions WrestlingMCPW Tag Team Championship (1 time) – with Gregory IronPrime WrestlingPrime Tag Team Championship (2 times) – with Gregory IronPro Wrestling All-Stars Of DetroitPWASD Downriver Championship (1 time)
PWASD Tag Team Championship (1 time) – with Gregory IronPro Wrestling IllustratedPWI Most Inspirational Wrestler of the Year (2003)
PWI Rookie of the Year (2003)Pro Wrestling SyndicatePWS Tag Team Championship (1 time) – with Gregory IronPure Pro WrestlingPPW Michigan State Heavyweight Championship (1 time)Twin Wrestling EntertainmentNacho Cup (2006)Xtreme Intense Championship Wrestling'''
XICW Light Heavyweight Championship (3 times)
XICW Tag Team Championship (1 time) – with Jaimy Coxxx
XICW Xtreme Intense Championship (1 time)

References

External links

Online World of Wrestling profile
Official Zach Gowen Website

1983 births
American amputees
American male professional wrestlers
American Ninja Warrior contestants
Eastern Michigan University alumni
Living people
People from Melvindale, Michigan
People from Plymouth, Michigan
21st-century professional wrestlers
AAW Tag Team Champions